Tree-adjoining grammar (TAG) is a grammar formalism defined by Aravind Joshi.  Tree-adjoining grammars are somewhat similar to context-free grammars, but the elementary unit of rewriting is the tree rather than the symbol. Whereas context-free grammars have rules for rewriting symbols as strings of other symbols, tree-adjoining grammars have rules for rewriting the nodes of trees as other trees (see tree (graph theory) and tree (data structure)).

History
TAG originated in investigations by Joshi and his students into the family of adjunction grammars (AG), 
the "string grammar" of Zellig Harris. AGs handle exocentric properties of language in a natural and effective way, but do not have a good characterization of endocentric constructions; the converse is true of rewrite grammars, or phrase-structure grammar (PSG). In 1969, Joshi introduced a family of grammars that exploits this complementarity by mixing the two types of rules. A few very simple rewrite rules suffice to generate the vocabulary of strings for adjunction rules. This family is distinct from the Chomsky-Schützenberger hierarchy but intersects it in interesting and linguistically relevant ways. The center strings and adjunct strings can also be generated by a dependency grammar, avoiding the limitations of rewrite systems entirely.

Description
The rules in a TAG are trees with a special leaf node known as the foot node, which is anchored to a word. 
There are two types of basic trees in TAG: initial trees (often represented as '') and auxiliary trees ('').  Initial trees represent basic valency relations, while auxiliary trees allow for recursion.
Auxiliary trees have the root (top) node and foot node labeled with the same symbol.
A derivation starts with an initial tree, combining via either substitution or adjunction.   Substitution replaces a frontier node with another tree whose top node has the same label. The root/foot label of the auxiliary tree must match the label of the node at which it adjoins. Adjunction can thus have the effect of inserting an auxiliary tree into the center of another tree.

Other variants of TAG allow multi-component trees, trees with multiple foot nodes, and other extensions.

Complexity and application

Tree-adjoining grammars are more powerful (in terms of weak generative capacity) than context-free grammars, but less powerful than linear context-free rewriting systems, indexed or context-sensitive grammars.

A TAG can describe the language of squares (in which some arbitrary string is repeated), and the language . This type of processing can be represented by an embedded pushdown automaton.
Languages with cubes (i.e. triplicated strings) or with more than four distinct character strings of equal length cannot be generated by tree-adjoining grammars.

For these reasons, tree-adjoining grammars are often described as mildly context-sensitive.
These grammar classes are conjectured to be powerful enough to model natural languages while remaining efficiently parsable in the general case.

Equivalences

Vijay-Shanker and Weir (1994) demonstrate that linear indexed grammars, combinatory categorial grammar, tree-adjoining grammars, and head grammars are weakly equivalent formalisms, in that they all define the same string languages.

Lexicalized 
Lexicalized tree-adjoining grammars (LTAG) are a variant of TAG in which each elementary tree (initial or auxiliary) is associated with a lexical item.  A lexicalized grammar for English has been developed by the XTAG Research Group of the Institute for Research in Cognitive Science at the University of Pennsylvania.

Notes

References

External links
The XTAG project, which uses a TAG for natural language processing.
A tutorial on TAG
SemConst Documentation A quick survey on Syntax and Semantic Interface problematic within the TAG framework.
The TuLiPa project The Tübingen Linguistic Parsing Architecture (TuLiPA) is a multi-formalism syntactic (and semantic) parsing environment, designed mainly for multi-component tree adjoining grammars with tree tuples
The Metagrammar Toolkit which provides several tools to edit and compile MetaGrammars into TAGs. It also include a wide coverage French Metagrammars.
LLP2 A lexicalized tree adjoining grammar parser which provides an  easy to use graphical environment (page in French)

Generative linguistics
Grammar frameworks